For the American actor sometimes known as Kent Douglass see Douglass Montgomery.

Kent Gemmell Douglas (February 6, 1936 – April 12, 2009) was a professional ice hockey defenceman and coach.

Playing career

Early career
Douglas started his career with the Kitchener Canucks in the Ontario Hockey Association. He spent two seasons with the Canucks and eight seasons in the American Hockey League and the Western Hockey League with the Springfield Indians, Winnipeg Warriors and the Vancouver Canucks. In Springfield, Douglas came under the tutelage of Hall of Famer Eddie Shore, the then owner of the Indians. There, Douglas learned Shore's tough defensive style of play which contributed to the Indians three consecutive Calder Cup championships from 1960–1962.

Later years
In 1962–63, Douglas made his first trip to the National Hockey League. He played with the Toronto Maple Leafs and continued his aggressive style of play during his rookie season in the NHL. In 70 games, Douglas recorded 22 points and 105 PIM. The Leafs, that year, made it to the Stanley Cup Finals, where they played the Detroit Red Wings. Toronto defeated the Red Wings in five games to win the Stanley Cup giving Douglas a Stanley Cup in his first season in the NHL. Douglas was also awarded the Calder Memorial Trophy as rookie of the year in the NHL - the first defenceman to do so. The following season, Douglas split his time between the Leafs and the Rochester Americans of the AHL. He played 41 games with the Leafs and 27 games with the Americans that season. His 41 games with the Leafs saw him record only one point.

Douglas remained with the Leafs until 1966–67, when he was demoted to the minors despite having appeared in three NHL All-Star Games and having played on three Stanley Cup winners with the Maple Leafs. Although he was part of Toronto's three Stanley Cup wins, Douglas' name was engraved on the Cup only once, in 1962-63.  In 1967–68, Douglas was claimed by the California Seals in the 1967 NHL Expansion Draft.  The California Seals changed their name before the start of the 1967-68 season to the Oakland Seals. Douglas played 40 games with the Seals before being traded to the Detroit Red Wings. Douglas would play the remainder of the season and the 1968–69 season with the Red Wings.  He was sent down to the AHL again the following year with the Rochester Americans. Douglas would stay in the AHL for the next three seasons, making the Calder Cup Finals with the Baltimore Clippers in 1971–72. In 1972–73 Douglas joined the New York Raiders in the World Hockey Association. Douglas played one season with the Raiders before returning to the minor leagues once again. He would play three more seasons before retiring.

Douglas died of cancer in 2009 at the age of 73.

Awards and achievements 
 Calder Cup Championships (1960, 1961, & 1962)
 AHL First All-Star Team (1962)
 Eddie Shore Award (1962)
 Calder Memorial Trophy (1963)
 Played in NHL All-Star Game (1962, 1963 & 1964)
 Stanley Cup Championship (1963)
 AHL Second All-Star Team (1971)

Career statistics

Regular season and playoffs

References

External links

Picture of 1963 Stanley Cup Plaque

1936 births
2009 deaths
American Hockey League coaches
Baltimore Clippers players
Calder Trophy winners
Canadian ice hockey defencemen
Detroit Red Wings players
Ice hockey people from Ontario
Kitchener Canucks players
New York Raiders players
Oakland Seals players
People from Cobalt, Ontario
Rochester Americans players
Springfield Indians players
Stanley Cup champions
Toronto Maple Leafs players
Vancouver Canucks (WHL) players
Winnipeg Warriors (minor pro) players
Canadian ice hockey coaches